The Fort de El Tolmo (Spanish: Fuerte de El Tolmo) was a fort located in Algeciras, Spain. It was declared Bien de Interés Cultural in 1985.  Only large ruins remain.

References 

Bien de Interés Cultural landmarks in the Province of Cádiz
Forts in Spain
18th-century fortifications
Buildings and structures in Algeciras
Demolished buildings and structures in Spain
Buildings and structures completed in 1741
Buildings and structures in Spain demolished during the Peninsular War
Former military buildings and structures
Buildings and structures demolished in 1811